Oregon Route 37 is a state highway in the U.S. state of Oregon that runs between Cold Springs Junction on the Columbia River in north-central Oregon, to the city of Pendleton.  The highway comprises the Pendleton-Cold Springs Highway No. 36 (see Oregon highways and routes), and part of the Pendleton-John Day Highway No. 28.

Route description
Oregon Route 37 begins (at its southern terminus) at an interchange with Interstate 84 and U.S. Route 395 just south of downtown Pendleton.  Heading north from that interchange, the highway skirts the western edge of downtown, briefly shares an alignment with U.S. Route 30 over the Pendleton Highway No. 67, and then heads north out of Pendleton.  
At an intersection with Oregon Route 334, the highway turns west-northwest for the remainder of its length, terminating at an intersection with U.S. Route 730 near Cold Springs Junction.  Just west of the junction lies Hat Rock State Park.

UPDATE: According to the ODOT Digital Video Log, Oregon Route 37 is signed as ending at the intersection of Westgate and Northgate (just south of Carden Ave) in Pendleton. This video log does not show the route as starting at I-84 Exit 209 and skirting the west edge of downtown Pendleton as the above paragraph suggests.

Major intersections
Note: OR 37 uses several different highways (see Oregon highways and routes); the milepoint column shows mileage along these highways, not adjusted for equations, with the highway number in front.

References

037
Transportation in Umatilla County, Oregon
Pendleton, Oregon